Scaphosepalum swertiifolium is a species of orchid found from Colombia to Ecuador.

swertifolium
Orchids of Colombia
Orchids of Ecuador